The Bellinzona Ladies Open is a tournament for professional female tennis players played on outdoor clay courts. The event is classified as a $60,000 ITF Women's World Tennis Tour tournament and has been held in Bellinzona, Switzerland, since 2021.

Past finals

Singles

Doubles

External links
 ITF search
 

ITF Women's World Tennis Tour
Clay court tennis tournaments
Tennis tournaments in Switzerland
Recurring sporting events established in 2021